Wishaw is one of the twenty-one wards used to elect members of the North Lanarkshire Council. It elects four councillors and covers the town centre of Wishaw plus the neighbourhoods to its south and east including Gowkthrapple, Netherton, Overtown, Pather and Waterloo, with a population of 17,974 in 2019; created in 2007, its territory remained almost unchanged in a 2017 national review, other than the loss of a few streets by moving a section of the boundary south from the Temple Gill burn to the edge of Belhaven Park.

Councillors

Election Results

2022 Election

2017 Election
2017 North Lanarkshire Council election

2012 Election
2012 North Lanarkshire Council election
 

On 8 March 2016, Labour councillor Sam Love resigned from the party and became Independent.
Labour councillor Frank McKay resigned from the party and became Independent on 21 November 2016.

2015 by-election
SNP councillor Marion Fellows was elected as an MP for Motherwell and Wishaw on 7 May 2015. She resigned her Council seat on 25 May 2015 and a by-election was held 13 August 2015 – the seat was held by the party's Rosa Zambonini.

2007 Election
2007 North Lanarkshire Council election

References

Wards of North Lanarkshire
Wishaw